Harbrinderjit Singh Dillon (23 April 1945 – 16 September 2019) was an Indonesian Sikh who occupied a variety of positions in Indonesian political life, including assistant to the Minister of Agriculture, and Commissioner of the National Commission on Human Rights). His  positions included executive director of Partnership Governance Reform in Indonesia. He was an outspoken critic of corruption in Indonesia.

H.S. Dillon was also the founder of The Foundation for International Human Rights Reporting Standards (FIHRRST), an international association dedicated to the respect, protection and fulfilment of human rights. Dillon was joined by a group of internationally respected human rights advocates (among others, Marzuki Darusman, Marzuki Usman, Makarim Wibisono, James Kallman, Dradjad Hari Wibowo) to establish the organization, which develops and promotes standards by which adherence to human rights principles can be demonstrated.

He studied at Cornell University in the United States, earning his PhD in agricultural economics and also studying subjects including international trade and development, resource management, and developmental sociology.

References

Bibliography
 H. S. Dillon and Marcellus Rantetana, Food Security in Indonesia, (Chapter 4 in Vijay S Vyas, Food Security in Asian Countries 2005   )
see HS Dillon, a fearless campaigner which lists several publications.

External links
HS Dillon, a fearless campaigner - March 09, 2005. Interview, personal background and list of positions.
Indonesians in Focus: H. S. Dillon - H. S. Dillon and governance reform planetmole.org''
 The Association for Human Rights Reporting Standards (FIHRRST)

1945 births
2019 deaths
Indonesian politicians
Cornell University College of Agriculture and Life Sciences alumni
Indonesian politicians of Indian descent
Indonesian people of Indian descent
Indonesian Sikhs
Indonesian people of Punjabi descent
People from Medan
Indonesian economists
20th-century Indonesian politicians
21st-century Indonesian politicians
University of North Sumatra alumni